George L. Hollahan Jr. (May 1, 1919 – August 1982) was an American politician. He served as a Democratic member of the Florida House of Representatives.
He also served as a member for the 43rd and 44th district of the Florida Senate.

Life and career 
Hollahan was born in Pittsburgh, Pennsylvania. He attended Riverside Military Academy and the University of Miami. He served in the United States Navy during World War II.

In 1957, Hollahan was elected to the Florida House of Representatives, serving until 1963. In the same year, he was elected to represent the 43rd district of the Florida Senate. He served until 1965, when he was succeeded by Robert L. Shevin. In 1966, he was elected to represent the 44th district, serving until 1972.

Hollahan died in August 1982, at the age of 63.

References 

1919 births
1982 deaths
Politicians from Pittsburgh
Democratic Party Florida state senators
Democratic Party members of the Florida House of Representatives
20th-century American politicians
University of Miami alumni